The Nantlle Ridge is the name given to a small range of mountains in Snowdonia, north Wales which runs south-west from the village of Rhyd Ddu for a distance of about , ending above Nebo in the Nantlle Valley.

The Nantlle Ridge offers excellent hill walking with fewer crowds than on the more popular parts of Snowdonia. It can be started from either end, but the Rhyd Ddu end tends to be the more popular. There are no great technical difficulties, although a little scrambling may be required on some parts of the ridge.

Summits
Starting from the Rhyd Ddu end, the Nantlle Ridge is composed of the following peaks (see hill lists in the British Isles for an explanation of the terms "Nuttall", "Hewitt" and "Marilyn"):
 Y Garn) — sub-Hewitt, Nuttall
 Mynydd Drws-y-Coed) — Hewitt, Nuttall
 Trum y Ddysgl) — Marilyn, Hewitt, Nuttall
 Mynydd Tal-y-Mignedd) — Hewitt, Nuttall
 Craig Cwm Silyn) — Marilyn, Hewitt, Nuttall
 Garnedd Goch) — sub-Hewitt, Nuttall
 Mynydd Graig Goch)— Hewitt, Nuttall

Craig Cwm Silyn is the highest point on the ridge, and can be reached by following the minor road running from Llanllyfni towards Llynnau Cwm Silyn, or as part of a traverse of the Nantlle Ridge from Rhyd Ddu. The crag of Craig yr Ogof is popular with rock climbers.

References 
Terry Marsh (1993) The summits of Snowdonia (Robert Hale)

External links
 Nantlle Ridge Walk on Mud and Routes
www.geograph.co.uk : photos of the Nantlle Ridge and surrounding area

Betws Garmon
Clynnog
Dolbenmaen
Llanllyfni
Mountains and hills of Gwynedd
Mountains and hills of Snowdonia